Kimiko Date-Krumm was the defending champion, having won the event in 2012, but retired in the second round against qualifier An-Sophie Mestach, who went on to win the tournament. She defeated Wang Qiang in the final, 1–6, 6–3, 6–0.

Seeds

Main draw

Finals

Top half

Bottom half

References 
 Main draw

Kangaroo Cup - Singles
2013 in Japanese tennis
Kangaroo Cup